Car Show Tour is a compilation album by American DJ Funkmaster Flex. It was released on December 6, 2005 via Koch Records, along with a DVD that features a documentary about a Miami car and hip hop show hosted by Funk Flex.

Production was handled by several record producers, including DVLP, Alchemist, Cipha Sounds, Dame Grease, DJ Khalil, Emile, Red Spyda, Ron Browz and Salaam Remi.

It features guest appearances from The Diplomats, The Lox, 50 Cent, Beanie Sigel, David Banner, Elephant Man, Fabolous, Jae Millz, J-Hood, Lil Wayne, Maino, Mobb Deep, Nas, O-Solo, Rockwilder, Papoose, Paul Wall, Strong Arm Steady, T.I. and Xzibit.

The album peaked at #41 on the Top R&B/Hip-Hop Albums and #9 on the Independent Albums, while 50 Cent's "Just a Touch" reached #72 on the Hot R&B/Hip-Hop Songs.

Track listing

Notes
 signifies a co-producer.

Charts

References

External links

2005 albums
E1 Music albums
Funkmaster Flex albums
Hip hop compilation albums
Albums produced by DJ Khalil
Albums produced by Ron Browz
Albums produced by Rockwilder
Albums produced by Dame Grease
Albums produced by Salaam Remi
Albums produced by David Banner
Albums produced by Emile Haynie
Albums produced by the Alchemist (musician)